John Minto (born ) is a New Zealand political activist known for his involvement in various left-wing groups and causes, most notably Halt All Racist Tours. A 2005 documentary on New Zealand's Top 100 History Makers listed him as number 89. Today he is involved with the protest group Global Peace and Justice Auckland and the Unite Union. He also wrote a weekly column for The Press and was formerly editor of the (now defunct) Workers' Charter newspaper.

Minto is a long-time member of the Post Primary Teachers' Association (PPTA) and also a national vice chairperson of QPEC, Quality Public Education Coalition (Inc) and co-vice-president of the Mana Movement. Minto was also a teacher at Hornby High School and retired from teaching in 2018.

Activist career

Halt All Racist Tours
Trevor Richards, Tom Newnham and others formed Halt All Racist Tours to protest against rugby union tours to and from Apartheid South Africa, in 1969. Minto became the National Chairman of the organisation in 1980. In 1981, Minto was actively involved in protests against the South Africa national rugby union team's tour of New Zealand. He was assaulted by rugby supporters the evening after a disruptive protest at Rugby Park in Hamilton. This prompted him to add a protective helmet to his distinctive outfit of overalls. He remained at the forefront of the protests.

The New Zealand Security Intelligence Service (SIS) listed Minto in 1981 on a list of 'subversives' for the events of that year. In 2005 a police baton owned by Ross Meurant, a former member of Parliament who was second in charge of the "Red Squad" during the 1981 Springbok Tour was put up for auction online labelled as a "Minto Bar", a "joke" based on the co-incidence of names between John Minto and Minties, the brand name of a popular mint-flavoured sweet. In 2009 John Minto's helmet appeared in an episode of Tales from Te Papa a television series of mini-documentaries about objects from the collection of the Museum of New Zealand Te Papa Tongarewa.

In 2021, Minto organised a series of events around New Zealand, including in New Plymouth, Dunedin, and Invercargill, to mark the 40th anniversary of the protests against the 1981 Springbok Tour.

Companion of OR Tambo Award
During January 2008 Minto publicly "rejected" a nomination for the South African Companion of OR Tambo Award, saying he was dismayed over current conditions in the country. However, the Presidency of South Africa later stated that Minto had not been nominated for any national award.

Palestinian solidarity activism
In January 2009 Minto led a protest to the Auckland Tennis Stadium, where they demanded that Israeli player Shahar Pe'er, who served a compulsory two-years service in the Israel Defense Forces, withdraw from the tournament and denounce the Israeli Government and its actions in the 2008–2009 Israel-Gaza conflict, adding that she should respect international calls for a boycott against Israel. Pe'er ignored the group's demands and participated in the tournament as planned, stating at a press conference that "I think [the politics] is nothing to do with what I am doing".

Maurice Williamson, a member of parliament, rebuffed the protesters at the event, stating that Pe'er was not representing Israel and was playing as a private individual, and that thus the protesters should "leave her alone".

A similar protest occurred at the January 2010 event, where Shahar Pe'er again competed. On the third day of protest (7 January 2010) John Minto was one of five protesters arrested outside the ASB Tennis Centre in Auckland on a charge of disorderly behaviour. He later received of a 500-metre trespass-order. Minto subsequently successfully appealed his conviction on the charge of disorderly behaviour.

By 2021, Minto had become the Chair of the Palestine Solidarity Network Aotearoa (PSNA), which staged protests in response to the 2021 Israel–Palestine crisis and has called for the closure of the Israeli Embassy in Wellington. Minto has also expressed support for the Boycott, Divestment and Sanctions (BDS) movement, alleging that Israel is an "Apartheid state.

As Chair of the PSNA, Minto opposed the New Zealand Government's decision to join the International Holocaust Remembrance Alliance (IHRA) as an observer on 24 June 2022. He claimed that IHRA was a partisan organisation seeking to deflect criticism of Israeli policies and actions towards the Palestinians with what he regarded as "false smears" of antisemitism.

Political career

Mayoralty bids
In April 2013, Minto announced his intention to run for the mayoralty of Auckland on the Mana Movement ticket. Minto has several candidates that are running for Councillor on the Minto for Mayor ticket.

In July 2016, Minto announced he will run in the 2016 Christchurch mayoral election as a candidate for The Keep Our Assets group.

Internet Mana 
Minto stood in the 2014 elections as a candidate for the Internet Mana party, and was ranked fourth on the party list.

Views and positions

COVID-19 pandemic
During the COVID-19 pandemic in New Zealand, John Minto expressed support for receiving COVID-19 vaccines but disagreed with the Government's vaccine mandate. Minto argued that vaccine mandates were an overreach of state power since they gave the Government the right to dismiss education and medical personnel for refusing to get vaccinated.

Personal life
Since 2014, Minto has lived in the Christchurch suburb of Waltham. The sculptor Llew Summers was his brother-in-law.

See also
Halt All Racist Tours
1981 Springbok Tour

References

Living people
New Zealand activists
New Zealand left-wing activists
1950s births
Mana Movement politicians
Unsuccessful candidates in the 2011 New Zealand general election
Unsuccessful candidates in the 2014 New Zealand general election